The Snipe incident was a military incident that took place between Chile and Argentina during 1958 as a result of a disputed border line in the Beagle Channel.

The two countries disagreed about the sovereign rights over the zone and Snipe, an uninhabitable islet between Picton Island and Navarino Island, claimed by both. Chileans call the waterway around the islet Beagle Channel, but in Argentina they called it Moat channel on the grounds that the Beagle Channel, allegedly, went south around Navarino Island. In accordance with the Beagle Channel Arbitration and the Treaty of Peace and Friendship of 1984 between Chile and Argentina, it should be called Beagle Channel.

The incident began on 12 January 1958 as the crew of the Chilean Navy transporter Micalvi built a lighthouse on the islet Snipe to improve navigation in the channel. The beacon of the lighthouse was installed on 1 May.

In April, Isaac Francisco Rojas, Commander of Naval Operations of the Argentine Navy, ordered the destruction of the Chilean lighthouse and its replacement with an Argentine one.

On 11 May, the Argentine lighthouse was dismantled and transported to Puerto Williams by the crew of the Chilean patrol boat Lientur. Later, on 15 May, the same crew recovered the remains of the first Chilean lighthouse that had been removed and thrown into the sea by the crew of the Argentine patrol boat ARA Guaraní.

On 8 June, a new Chilean lighthouse was installed on the islet by the crew of the Lientur.

The next day, 9 June 1958, the Chilean lighthouse was shelled and destroyed by the  main guns of the Argentine destroyer ARA San Juan, and a company of Argentine naval infantry occupied the islet to impose the Argentine claim.

Despite the military buildup, a truce was agreed between the parties, that brought a return to previous status quo: no lighthouse and withdrawal of the Argentine military from the islet.

Aftermath 
The conflict over the islet (and the zone) was postponed, but Argentina maintained that the zone was disputed, and without a satisfactory solution, there would be no advance or economic use of the zone.

To confront the crisis, the Chilean government, in the last days of the second Carlos Ibáñez del Campo administration, issued the Ley Reservada del Cobre (Spanish for Copper secret law) that provided yearly for part of state owned Codelco's copper sales, without parliamentary control, for the purchase of weapons.

Twenty years later, in 1978, in order to avoid a repetition of the fait accompli, Chile placed troops on Snipe and their other islands south of the Beagle Channel before the start of Operation Soberania, Argentina's planned invasion.

The fate of Snipe islet has since been settled by the Treaty of Peace and Friendship of 1984, as an internationally recognized territory of Chile. There is now a lighthouse on the islet.

See also 

 Falklands War
 Hope Bay incident
 List of violent incidents at the Argentine border
 List of incidents during the Beagle conflict
 Laguna del Desierto incident

References

Bibliography 

 
 
 Isaac Francisco Rojas (Koordinator), La Argentina en el Beagle y Atlantico sur, (1° Parte), Editorial Diagraf. 
 
 

Beagle conflict
History of Argentina (1955–1973)
1958 in Argentina
1958 in Chile
Maritime incidents in 1958
Maritime incidents in Chile
International maritime incidents
Conflicts in 1958
1958 in international relations
Battles and conflicts without fatalities
Argentina–Chile relations
History of Tierra del Fuego
Combat incidents